The 2007–08 Atlantic Coast Conference men's basketball season was the 55th season for the league.  The North Carolina Tar Heels won both the regular-season and conference titles.  The ACC sent four teams to the NCAA tournament: North Carolina, Duke, Clemson and Miami.

Final standings

Statistical leaders

Players of the week
Throughout the conference season, the ACC offices name a player and rookie of the week.  North Carolina's Tyler Hansbrough broke the ACC single-season record for player of the week honors during the 2007–08 season with eight awards.  The record had previously been seven, held by JJ Redick and Antawn Jamison. The MVP of the ACC tournament is the automatic winner of the final ACC player of the week of each season.

Conference honors
ACC Conference awards were handed out at the conclusion of the regular season.  Tyler Hansbrough was the unanimous choice for ACC player of the year, while Virginia Tech's Seth Greenberg won conference Coach of the Year honors for guiding the Hokies to a fourth-place finish after being picked tenth in the preseason.  Duke swept the remaining individual honors as Kyle Singler and DeMarcus Nelson won Rookie of the Year and Defensive Player of the Year respectively.

Player of the year
Tyler Hansbrough, North Carolina

Rookie of the year
Kyle Singler, Duke

Coach of the year
Seth Greenberg, Virginia Tech

Defensive player of the year
DeMarcus Nelson, Duke

All-Atlantic Coast Conference
First Team
Tyler Hansbrough, Jr., North Carolina
Tyrese Rice, Jr., Boston College
Sean Singletary, Sr., Virginia
DeMarcus Nelson, Sr., Duke
Jack McClinton, Jr., Miami

Second Team
Greivis Vásquez, So., Maryland
James Gist, Sr., Maryland
Wayne Ellington, So., North Carolina
A. D. Vassallo, Jr., Virginia Tech
K. C. Rivers, Jr., Clemson

Third Team
Kyle Singler, Fr., Duke
Cliff Hammonds, Sr., Clemson
Toney Douglas, Jr., Florida State
James Johnson, Fr., Wake Forest
Greg Paulus, Jr., Duke

Honorable Mention:
Ty Lawson, So., UNC; J. J. Hickson, Fr., NCSU; Deron Washington, Sr., VT; Anthony Morrow, Sr., GT

All-ACC freshman team
Kyle Singler, Duke
James Johnson, Wake Forest
J. J. Hickson, NC State
Jeff Allen, Virginia Tech
Jeff Teague, Wake Forest

Honorable Mention:
Terrence Oglesby, Clemson

All-ACC Defensive team
DeMarcus Nelson, Sr., Duke
Toney Douglas, Jr., Florida State
Tyrelle Blair, Sr., Boston College
Marcus Ginyard, Jr., North Carolina
James Gist, Sr., Maryland

Honorable Mention:
Cliff Hammonds, Sr., Clemson; D'Andre Bell, Jr., GT; Tyler Hansbrough, Jr., UNC; Jeff Allen, Fr., VT; Deron Washington, Sr., VT; James Mays, Sr., Clemson

ACC tournament
See 2008 ACC men's basketball tournament

Postseason

NCAA tournament

ACC Record: 6–4

1 North Carolina (4–1) – Final Four
W 16 Mount St. Mary's 113–76
W 9 Arkansas 108–77
W 4 Washington State 68–47
W 3 Louisville 83–73
L 1 Kansas 66–84

2 Duke (1–1)
W 15 Belmont 71–70
L 7 West Virginia 67–73

5 Clemson (0–1)
L 12 Villanova 69–75

7 Miami (1–1)
W 10 St, Mary's 78–64
L 2 Texas 72–75

NIT

ACC Record: 3–3

1 Virginia Tech (2–1) 
W 8 Morgan State 94–62
W 5 Alabama-Birmingham 75–49
L 2 Ole Miss 72–81

3 Florida State (0–1)
L 6 Akron 60–63 (OT)

5 Maryland (1–1)
W 4 Minnesota 68–58
L 1 Syracuse 72–88

CBI

ACC Record: 2–1

1 Virginia (2–1)
W 4 Richmond 66–64
W 2 Old Dominion 80–76
L 1 Bradley 85–96

References

External links
 Final ACC Statistics
 Info at SportsStats.com